Prodaphaenus ("before Daphoenus") is an extinct genus of placental mammals from clade Carnivoraformes, that lived in North America during the middle Eocene.

Phylogeny
The phylogenetic relationships of genus Prodaphaenus are shown in the following cladogram:

See also
 Mammal classification
 Carnivoraformes
 Miacidae

References

†
Miacids
Extinct mammals of North America
Prehistoric placental genera